The Kill Screen Festival (often simply known as Kill Screen Fest; formerly two5six) is an annual video game developer conference inaugurated on 11 May 2013 in New York City by the print and online magazine Kill Screen. The annual conference focuses on video games, art and culture and features speakers from both the entertainment and video game industry.

History 

The conference was announced on 20 March 2013 by Kill Screen on Vimeo and was named two5six, which was filmed at The Invisible Dog Art Center. The conference was officially inaugurated on 11 May 2013 at The Invisible Dog Art Center. It was held on 16 May 2014 again at the Roulette Intermedium and at Villain from 15–17 May.

Within the 2015 two5six festival, Kill Screen introduced Game Academy, an event workshop where participants who had little-to-no knowledge of code could learn. Intel sponsored some workshops and provided "game scholars", those experienced in programming. It also expanded to include a film festival, effectively making the festival two days longer.

In April 2016, Kill Screen announced that two5six became Kill Screen Festival, and was held on 4 June at the Roulette Intermedium.

Conference

References 

Annual events in New York City
May events
Festivals in New York City
2013 establishments in New York City